Sarajlić is a Bosnian surname derived from the city of Sarajevo. Notable people with the surname include:
Adnan Sarajlić (born 1981), Bosnian footballer
Asim Sarajlić (born 1975), Bosnian politician
Izet Sarajlić (1930–2002), Bosnian historian of philosophy, essayist, translator and poet
Nafija Sarajlić (1893–1970), first female Bosnian prose writer and poet
Sead Sarajlić (born 1957), retired Bosnian footballer

Bosnian surnames